The 1916–17 Georgetown Hoyas men's basketball team represented Georgetown University during the 1916-17 NCAA college basketball season. John O'Reilly coached the team in his third season as head coach. Georgetown was an independent and played its home games at Ryan Gymnasium on the Georgetown campus in Washington, D.C., and finished the season with a record of 8-4.

Season recap

The Hoyas victory over Bucknell on the last day of the season began a home winning streak at Ryan Gymnasium that would reach 52 games before finally coming to an end during the 1923-24 season. Georgetown also defeated crosstown rival George Washington twice this season, giving the Hoyas a six-game winning streak against George Washington – five of the wins at Ryan Gymnasium – dating back to 1915.

A graduate of St. Francis College of Pennsylvania, where he had played basketball, forward Fred Fees enrolled in Georgetown University Law School and joined the team – permitted despite his undergraduate playing time under the eligibility rules of the era – for the first of four seasons with the Hoyas. A free-throw shooting specialist in an era when the rules of college basketball allowed teams to choose which player shot its free throws, Fees exploited his free-throw prowess to establish himself as one of the top scorers in college basketball in the United States in each of his seasons with the Hoyas. This season he scored 195 of the teams 450 points, averaging 15.3 points per game to lead the team in scoring. He also shot 17-for-21 from the free-throw line in a game against George Washington, setting a school record for free throws made in a single game that no Hoya would exceed for 75 years.

Roster
Sources

Georgetown players did not wear numbers on their jerseys this season. The first numbered jerseys in Georgetown mens basketball history would not appear until the 1933-34 season.

1916–17 schedule and results
Sources

It was common practice at this time for colleges and universities to include non-collegiate opponents in their schedules, with the games recognized as part of their official record for the season, and had the February 3, 1917, game against the Crescent Athletic Club not been cancelled, it would have counted as part of Georgetowns won-loss record for 1916-17. It was not until 1952, after the completion of the 1951-52 season, that the National Collegiate Athletic Association (NCAA) ruled that colleges and universities could no longer count games played against non-collegiate opponents in their annual won-loss records.

Trinity College of North Carolina was the future Duke University.

|-
!colspan=9 style="background:#002147; color:#8D817B;"| Regular Season

References

Georgetown Hoyas men's basketball seasons
Georgetown
Georgetown Hoyas men's basketball team
Georgetown Hoyas men's basketball team